Uzura Dam  is a rockfill dam located in Hokkaido Prefecture in Japan. The dam is used for irrigation. The catchment area of the dam is 41.9 km2. The dam impounds about 66  ha of land when full and can store 10000 thousand cubic meters of water. The construction of the dam was started on 1969 and completed in 2001.

References

Dams in Hokkaido